The Groningen-Assen metropolitan area includes the key cities of Groningen (230,000 inhabitants) and Assen (67,000 inhabitants) as well as the surrounding municipalities. Altogether it had over half a million inhabitants in 2018.

The airport of the region is Groningen Airport Eelde.

The metropolitan region

References

Metropolitan areas of the Netherlands